Toledo is a city located on the Yaquina River and along U.S. Route 20 in Lincoln County, in the U.S. state of Oregon. The population was 3,465 at the 2010 census.  The city was a 2009 All-America City Award finalist.

History 
European-American settlement in Toledo began in 1866, when John Graham, his son Joseph, and William Mackey, claimed land made available by the Homestead Act of 1862. The site was called "Graham's Landing" until a post office was established two years later. Joseph D. Graham, John's son, named the post office for Toledo, Ohio, because he was homesick. William Mackey was the first postmaster.

Toledo was made the county seat of the newly established Lincoln County in 1893. The city incorporated in 1893 and reincorporated in 1905. Charles Barton Crosno served as the first mayor. The county seat moved from Toledo to Newport in 1953.

In 1918, the Port of Toledo leased land to the Spruce Production Division for a sawmill to cut airplane frames for World War I. However, before production began, the war ended. C. D. Johnson and associates then bought the mill and related equipment, which by 1923 processed logs shipped to Toledo by rail. Georgia-Pacific acquired the operation in 1951 and turned it into a pulp mill.

In 1925, the Pacific Spruce Corporation decided to hire Japanese contract labor to sort lumber in its Toledo sawmill.  Managers informed local employees that only the Japanese would work the graveyard shift.  The sawmill employees did not object, but local businessmen opposed bringing Japanese workers into the community.  Two days after the Japanese arrived, a mob forced a Japanese labor crew to leave town.  A year later, Tamakichi Ogura filed a lawsuit in the United States District Court alleging that nine individuals had violated his civil rights by assaulting him, stealing his property, and forcibly removing him from the Toledo community.  After a nine-day trial, the jury unanimously agreed with Ogura and awarded him $2,500 in damages plus court costs. A book was written about this called The Toledo Incident of 1925.

Geography 

Demographics

2010 census
As of the census of 2010, there were 3,465 people, 1,331 households, and 907 families residing in the city. The racial makeup of the city was 89.9% White, 0.6% African American, 3.8% Native American, 0.5% Asian, 0.1% Pacific Islander, 1.2% from other races, and 3.9% from two or more races. Hispanic or Latino of any race were 4.7% of the population.

There were 1,331 households, of which 33.9% had children under the age of 18 living with them, 47.5% were married couples living together, 14.2% had a female householder with no husband present, 6.5% had a male householder with no wife present, and 31.9% were non-families. 22.7% of all households were made up of individuals, and 6.1% had someone living alone who was 65 years of age or older. The average household size was 2.60 and the average family size was 3.02.

The median age in the city was 37.6 years. 24.8% of residents were under the age of 18; 8.8% were between the ages of 18 and 24; 26.2% were from 25 to 44; 28.5% were from 45 to 64; and 11.8% were 65 years of age or older. The gender makeup of the city was 48.7% male and 51.3% female.

2000 census
As of the census of 2000, there were 3,472 people in the city, organized into 1,312 households and 926 families. The population density was 1,602.2 people per square mile (617.8/km). There were 1,474 housing units at an average density of 680.2 per square mile (262.3/km). The racial makeup of the city was 91.88% White, 3.37% Native American, 0.58% Asian, 0.23% African American, 0.03% Pacific Islander, 0.52% from other races, and 3.40% from two or more races. 2.59% of the population were Hispanic or Latino of any race.

There were 1,312 households, out of which 37.7% had children under the age of 18 living with them, 51.5% were married couples living together, 14.0% had a female householder with no husband present, and 29.4% were non-families. 23.0% of all households were made up of individuals, and 9.5% had someone living alone who was 65 years of age or older. The average household size was 2.65 and the average family size was 3.05.

In the city, the population was spread out, with 29.6% under the age of 18, 6.9% from 18 to 24, 32.0% from 25 to 44, 20.9% from 45 to 64, and 10.6% who were 65 years of age or older. The median age was 34 years. For every 100 females, there were 97.4 males. For every 100 females age 18 and over, there were 92.7 males.

The median income for a household in the city was $34,503, and the median income for a family was $39,597. Males had a median income of $35,104 versus $22,297 for females. The per capita income for the city was $14,710. 19.3% of the population and 18.6% of families were below the poverty line. Out of the total population, 26.6% of those under the age of 18 and 8.9% of those 65 and older were living below the poverty line.

Education
There are two public schools in Toledo, which are part of the Lincoln County School District: Toledo Elementary School (K–6) and Toledo High School (7–12). Toledo High School is a combination junior high and high school, and serves students in seventh through twelfth grade.

Transportation
Toledo is the western terminus of a Portland and Western Railroad line, once part of the Oregon Pacific Railroad, that links the city to Albany in the Willamette Valley. The city is also served by the port authority (the Port of Toledo), and Toledo State Airport.

First brick depot in Oregon
On 3 August 1893, Toledo became the first city to have a railroad depot made out of brick. The reason to build a depot had to do with a dispute of a twenty-foot strip of land. The city of Toledo, at the time, had no depot provided to the citizens. However, the citizens of Toledo made a demand on the railroad commissioners asking that the Oregon Pacific be forced to provide reasonable accommodations there. The people of Toledo and Oregon Pacific agreed to a contract: the people would pay $250 in money and to furnish an equal amount of labor on the building. Oregon Pacific, in return, agreed to erect within sixty days from the date of the contract a brick depot building at Toledo of the size and dimensions as before agreed upon at 20 feet by 60 feet.

References

External links 

 Entry for Toledo in the Oregon Blue Book
 Historic images of Toledo from the Salem Public Library Historic Photograph Collection

1905 establishments in Oregon
Cities in Lincoln County, Oregon
Cities in Oregon
Populated places established in 1905
Port cities in Oregon
Former county seats in Oregon
Sundown towns in Oregon